is a Japanese animation studio founded in 2009. The studio specializes in CGI. The studio became an asset of the newly formed Sola Entertainment production management company in 2017.

Works

Television series

OVAs/ONAs
Evangelion:Another Impact (2015)
Ultraman (2019–present, with Production I.G)
Ghost in the Shell: SAC_2045 (2020–2022, with Production I.G)

Films
Starship Troopers: Invasion (2012)
Appleseed Alpha (2014)
Starship Troopers: Traitor of Mars (2017)
Ghost in the Shell: SAC_2045 Sustainable War (2021, with Production I.G)
The Lord of the Rings: The War of the Rohirrim (2024)

Video Games
Tekken 7 opening movie (2015)
Shin Godzilla special demo contents for PlayStation VR (2016)
Argyle Shift VR Attraction (2016)

References

External links

 
 

Sola Digital Arts
Japanese companies established in 2009
Animation studios in Tokyo
Japanese animation studios
Mass media companies established in 2009
Suginami